The New Zealand national cricket team toured Kenya In September 1997 and played three matches against Kenya en-route to their tour of Zimbabwe.

Matches

References

Kenya
1997 in Kenyan cricket